Irrigation in the Dominican Republic (DR) has been an integral part of DR agricultural and economic development in the 20th century. Public investment in irrigation has been the main driver for irrigation infrastructural development in the country. Irrigation Management Transfer to Water Users Associations (WUAs), formally started in the mid-1980s, is still an ongoing process showing positive signs with irrigation systems in 127,749 ha (46% of total irrigated land in the country), being managed by 41,329 users (57% of all users). However, the transfer process and the performance of WUAs are still far from ideal. While WUAs show a significant increase in cost recovery, especially when compared to low values in areas under state management, a high subsidy from the government still contributes to cover operation and maintenance costs in their systems.

Water demand for irrigation is 7,340.41 million m3/year which is 82% of the total demand (8,891,45 million m3/year). Irrigation demand is covered mostly by surface water, and partially (13%) by groundwater. About 76% of Dominican Republic's land area (8,900 km2) is dedicated to agriculture, 17% of which is irrigated. According to FAO, 270,000ha are equipped for irrigation. Most of the irrigated areas are located in the valleys between the mountain ranges, with a medium to low rainfall and few limitations on its soil such as slope, depth of soil, and in some cases, salinity problems associated with irrigation or the presence of saline groundwater. Annual government investment in water resources and irrigation infrastructure is in the order of US$100 million.

Needs in the irrigation sector are related to improving efficiency, productivity and
organizational aspects. According to the FAO, solutions should be sought in the use of better technology, efficient operation of irrigation systems and adequate means of financial support. Poor maintenance of existing infrastructure and irrational use of water are causes for the low (overall) irrigation efficiency.

History of the irrigation sector

According to the Food and Agriculture Organization (FAO), irrigation development in the Dominican Republic started in the late 19th century, with the construction of the Juan Caballero, Luis Bogart and Santana canals and the Manzanillo Project. In the 1920s, due mostly to government investment, irrigation development increased substantially. The area under irrigation continued increasing in the 1940s and 1950s, from 32,000ha in 1941 to 132,000 in 1954. During the 1960s hydraulic development shifted towards multi-purpose dams, returning to canal network development for the next 30 years and reaching the current 280,000ha equipped with irrigation infrastructure.

The Irrigation Management Transfer Program (IMTP) started formally in the mid-1980s and continues until today. IMTP aims at decentralizing operation and maintenance, and fee collection responsibilities among others to the Juntas de Regantes (Water Users Irrigation Boards - WUB). To this date, 17 main WUBs have been formed and the operation of 11 systems has been formally transferred to them. WUBs have a total membership of about 30,000 users. According to the FAO, some of the achievements of IMTP includes: (i) reduced conflicts between the authority and water users, (ii) improved service, and (iii) higher fee collection (an increase from 20% of total charges, when managed by National Institute for Water Resources to almost 80% on their own). However, these results are far from ideal. For example, overall cost recovery continues to be low hence O&M costs still depend on government subsidies.

Irrigation infrastructure
Gravity and surface irrigation are the predominant systems supplying water for irrigation to an area of 278,965 ha.(gross area). According to FAO, this is about half the land where irrigation is feasible (550,000 ha.). The existing infrastructure is composed of 1,836.4 km of main canals, 1,773.2 km of secondary canals, 1,200 km of drainage canals and 14 major dams. The total storage capacity is 1,450 million m3. Actual water delivery is approximately 4,600 million m3/year.

Environmental aspects

Linkages with water resources

According to FAO, DR receives a mean annual precipitation of about 1,500 mm; with arid zones receiving as less as 500 mm/year, and humid areas receiving an average of 2,500 mm/year. Evapotranspiration is over 2,000 mm/year. Total runoff is estimated at 21,000 Million m3/year.

Water demand for irrigation is 7,340.41 million m3/year which is 82% of the total demand (8,891,45 million m3/year). Irrigation demand is covered mostly by surface irrigation, and partially (13%) by groundwater.

Environmental impacts of irrigation

According to FAO, 125,000ha and 80,000ha are affected by drainage and salinity problems, respectively. The majority of which are located in the Valleys such as Cibao, Santiago Montecristi, Azua, San Juan de la Manguana, Neyba y Barahona as well as downstream Yuna and the eastern coastal area, in the provinces of Maria Trinidad Gracias y Altagracia respectively.

Anticipated climate change impacts on irrigated agriculture
Global climate change is expected to induce permanent climate shocks to the Caribbean region including sea level rise, higher surface air and sea temperatures, extreme weather events (such as tropical storms and hurricanes), increased rainfall intensity (leading to more frequent and severe flooding) and more frequent and severe "El Niño-like" conditions. Demographic growth accelerated environmental degradation, deforestation, and lack of mitigation measures will intensify the impact of disasters in the future.

There is currently no information available about the specific impacts of climate change on irrigated agriculture in the DR. Although there is some data in terms of Climate Change impacts on water resources in DR's First Communication to the UNFCCC. Indeed, it is expected a great decrease in spatial distribution of rainfall, and total runoff for the year 2100, demonstrating a structural change that intensifies the transition from the most humid zones to the driest and an expansion of the areas of the country that are historically the driest.

Legal and institutional framework

Legal framework

The Water Law, No. 5852 passed in 1962, promotes the creation of irrigation districts and irrigation organizations. Relevant aspects of this law include the establishment of limited property rights over water originated in one's land through springs and rain water and the linkage of water rights with land ownership.

Law No. 6 of 1965 created the National Institute for Water Resources (INDRHI), the national water authority, assigning functions for operating irrigation systems with the participation of users. INDRHI has been the promoter and developer of irrigation, thus having responsibility at three functional levels: policy development and planning at the constitutional (normative) level; water rights administration, regulation enforcement and hydrological services at the organizational level; and water use for the irrigation system at the operational level.

Presidential decrees and agreements between INDRHI and Water Users Association (Asociaciones de Regantes- WUA) have provided legal support for the Irrigation Management Transfer Program (IMTP) (see below).

Institutional framework
The Dominican Water Resource Institute – INDRHI, under the Ministry of the Environment, is responsible for managing water and related resources as well as designing, implementing, monitoring and evaluating programs, projects and activities aimed at controlling and regulating surface and groundwater use.

INDRHI is also in charge of irrigation systems management including responsibilities such as operation and maintenance of dam, main channel and drainage system of all irrigation systems, as well as of all the facilities in those systems that are not yet transferred to the WUAs. This transfer policy has been financed largely by international resources in coordination with the 10 Department of Irrigation Districts, under INDRHI. INDRHI is in the process of receding in their scope and operational responsibilities.

Finally, INDRHI collaborates with other sectoral institutions such as: (i) the State Secretariat for Agriculture and the Dominican Agriculture Institute, (ii) the Water Supply and Sanitation "Institute" INAPA, a utility operating in small towns and rural areas, and regional water and sanitation utilities in the cities of Santo Domingo, Santiago, Moca, Puerto Plata and Romana, (iii) the Ministry of Public Health, and (iv) the Dominican Electricity Corporation.

Water Users Organizations and Irrigation Management Transfer Program

The Irrigation Management Transfer Program (IMTP) shift responsibility for the administration, operation and maintenance (O&M) of irrigation infrastructure to WUAs while remaining state owned. The IMTP, still under implementation, has not been accompanied by a legal framework promoting further development of WUAs, their management practices, both in the administrative and commercial sense, and water management efficiency.

There are a total of 28 Irrigation Users Boards (Juntas de Regantes-WUB) represent a total of 71,800 water users (of a total of 89,300) covering 4.3 million tareas—15.9 tareas = 1 ha. The WUB are in charge of fee collection, operation, administration, budget preparation and expenditures. WUB are composed of Water Users Associations (Asociaciones de Regantes- WUA), and are legally considered as Non-profit organizations. Contrary to some WUBs, which have receive extended support from IMTP, WUAs are mostly weak when their organizational characteristics.

Source: INDRHI

Key Legal Issues that Arise in Irrigation PPPs
There are a number of legal and commercial issues that will affect how these projects move forward and are structured.  Whilst some of the legal issues are not confined to irrigation PPPs they can take on a new dimension and complexity when applied to irrigation: Land ownership; water extraction; public sector counterpart. These will be key issues in a PPP as the private provider will want to ensure a steady revenue stream.

There are also the usual legal considerations that need to be checked when developing PPPs in any sector, such as legal restrictions on the type of PPP arrangement that can be entered into, relevant procurement rules for entering into PPPs, existence of restrictions on foreign investment, taxation and potential for tax holidays and the ability to assign rights such as security and step in rights to lenders.

Economic aspects

Agriculture and economic growth
See also:Economy of the Dominican Republic
The economy of the Dominican Republic has shifted from an agricultural based one to a diversified economy where services, commerce, industry and tourism have a greater role. The contribution of agriculture to the Gross domestic product (GDP) has been declining since 1962 when it represented 32%, to only 13% in 2008. From this value, 53% correspond to livestock, fisheries and forestry. Crop production in 2000, 5% of total GDP, had a total value of U.S. $1,053 million at current prices. Agriculture, however, maintains an important role in exports and employment. Irrigated agriculture is contributing to this with nearly half of the total production. There is record increase of production in the irrigated land, but it is related more to the expansion in area rather than a marked rise in productivity.  Rural population accounts for 40% of the total population and 52% of the rural population is poor.

Water tariff
Annual fee for irrigation services are low (varies from US
$4.75/ha in some regions to US$24/ha for a farmer with less than 10 ha not
cultivating rice). Water costs for a farmer only represent 0.21 to 0.58% of total
production cost. Operation and Maintenance expenditure in INDRHI's Irrigation
Districts for 1997 was US$6.24 million (US$35/ha) while revenues from water fees was only 14% of this value. Water fees are obviously too low to meet maintenance and operation requirements.

External cooperation
In May 2008 the World Bank has approved a US$80 million loan to restore and strengthen irrigation, electricity, water, and sanitation infrastructure damaged by Tropical Storms Olga and Noel, enhance critical infrastructure to reduce future storm-related impacts, and strengthen basic capacity for future risk management in INDRHI and CDEEE.

Dominican Republic’s irrigation model: the road ahead

According to FAO, despite of IMTP success in development WUB's capacities some areas within the program have room for improvement. Those areas can be summarized as follow: (i) institutional capacity building has not been systematic. Follow up on existing support WUA has been concentrated only in certain issues, without due attention to certifying their organizational development and achievements; (ii) capacitation has not adequately included administrative skills, business like attitude, social and environmental topics; (iii) efforts have been concentrated on the WUBs, leaving the WUAs with little support to strengthen the capacities as organizations; (iv) irrigation infrastructure is usually transferred in poor shape demanding large investments; and (v) stronger legal support is needed for the transfer process.

The challenge ahead cannot be faced with the existing policies and institutional settings. Deep institutional reform and policy framing is considered to be the most pressing need by FAO. The government is trying to reorient the role of the state in WRM and reduce dependency on governmental financing. The proposal for the new Water Law introduces the National Water Commission as the regulatory authority of Water, and to which the entities in charge of regulating the different subsectors of services from water (water supply to population, irrigation and hydropower), will be ascribed to. This means that INDRHI will concentrate on regulating irrigation services, where the WUA will be operating the irrigation systems.

See also
Water resources management in the Dominican Republic
Water supply and sanitation in the Dominican Republic
Electricity sector in the Dominican Republic

References

 
Dominican Rep
Water in the Dominican Republic